Katie Amanda Colclough (born 20 January 1990) is a retired English road and track cyclist from Frieston near Grantham, Lincolnshire, and a former member of British Cycling's Olympic Development Squad.

Colclough began cycling competitively in 2004, the following year she was selected to ride for British Cycling's Talent Team. She joined the Olympic Development Programme in 2006.

In 2008-2009 Colclough rode road races with Team Halfords Bikehut. In 2011, she signed with the professional team  (now known as ). Colclough was part of the Specialized–lululemon squad which won the team time trial at the 2013 UCI Road World Championships, where she announced that she would be retiring from the sport after the road race.

Palmarès
Source:

2007
2nd Olveston National Series Road Race

2008 – Team Halfords Bikehut 2008 season
1st  Team pursuit, UEC European U23 Track Championships 
1st  Points Race, British National Track Championships (Junior)
2nd Points Race, British National Track Championships (Senior)
2nd Pursuit, British National Track Championships (Junior)
1st Team pursuit, Round 1, 2008–09 Track World Cup, Manchester
3rd Points race, Round 1, 2008–09 Track World Cup, Manchester
1st Team pursuit, Round 2, 2008–09 Track World Cup, Melbourne

2009
1st Team pursuit, Round 5, 2008–09 Track World Cup, Copenhagen
2nd Points race, Round 5, 2008–09 Track World Cup, Copenhagen
2nd British National Road Race Championships Under 23
2nd European road cycling championships, road race, Under 23
2nd, Team pursuit, 2009–2010 Track World Cup, Melbourne

2010
1st  Team pursuit, 2010 European Track Championships

2011 – HTC–Highroad 2011 season
UEC European U23 Track Championships
1st  Team Pursuit (with Laura Trott and Dani King)
2nd Points Race

2012 – Team Specialized–lululemon 2012 season
1st Stage 4, Gracia–Orlová
1st British National Road Race Championships Under 23

2013 – Specialized–lululemon 2013 season

1st  World Championship, Team Time Trial (together with Ellen van Dijk, Carmen Small, Evelyn Stevens, Lisa Brennauer and Trixi Worrack)
3rd British National Time Trial Championships

References

1990 births
Living people
English track cyclists
People from Grantham
English female cyclists
Cyclists at the 2010 Commonwealth Games
UCI Road World Champions (women)
Commonwealth Games competitors for England